LEAD College of Management (LEAD) is an MBA college, established in 2011 and the institution is approved by the All India Council for Technical Education (AICTE) for the Master of Business Administration two-year MBA program. The campus is located in Dhoni, Palakkad, Palakkad, Kerala LEAD was established by Dr. Thomas George under Prompt Charitable Trust. Its main objective to mold young entrepreneurs through the motive  such as Leadership & Entrepreneurship Academy.

History
LEAD College promoted by Prompt Charitable Trust that established in 2011 based at Palakkad.

Academics
MBA Two year regular programme.

Rankings
Lead College has been ranked 2nd in Kerala by the Times of India for the years 2019, 2020 and 2021.

References

General references
 
 Calicut University comes to the aid of foreign students

External links
The Official Website of LEAD

 

Business schools in Kerala
Colleges affiliated with the University of Calicut
Universities and colleges in Palakkad district
Educational institutions established in 2011
2011 establishments in India